Richard Lee "Rick" Simpson (born 5 July 1966) is a British Anglican priest. He has been the Archdeacon of Auckland in the Diocese of Durham since 2018.

Simpson was educated at Keble College, Oxford and Wycliffe Hall, Oxford. He was ordained deacon in 1993, and priest in 1994. He was a curate in Heaton, Newcastle until 1997. He was Priest in charge of Holy Trinity, Jesmond from 1997 to 2006; and then of St Brandon, Brancepeth from 2006. He was announced as the next Archdeacon of Auckland in October 2017. He was installed as archdeacon during a service at Durham Cathedral on 11 February 2018.

References

1966 births
Alumni of Keble College, Oxford
Archdeacons of Auckland
Living people
Alumni of Wycliffe Hall, Oxford